were Japanese female entertainers in the Heian and Kamakura periods who sang songs and performed dances. They danced dressed as men. The profession of  became popular in the 12th century. They would perform for the nobility, and at celebrations. The word  can also refer to the songs they sang and the dances they performed.

They are sometimes referred to as courtesans in the English language, but by nature they were performers. Some  did sometimes sleep with their patrons and give birth to nobles' children, but this was not their intended purpose as entertainers. The best known  were Shizuka Gozen, Giō and Hotoke, who were featured in The Tale of the Heike.

History

 appeared during the mid-Heian period (794–1185). As educated and cultured ladies, they become a superior group of courtesans noted for their singing, dancing and poetry as well as beauty.   became popular as entertainers in the 12th century, and many women then chose to be  because of their popularity. A  was always a woman who dressed in men's attire. They were popular in the late Heian and early Kamakura period in the 12th century, but during the 13th century, their status declined. They disappeared around the end of the Kamakura or the beginning of the Muromachi period in the 14th century.

It has been said that the  culture greatly influenced Noh drama by bringing forth , an unorthodox form of dancing, and introducing it to Noh.

Attire and appearance
 were recognizable for their clothing, which was Shinto-inspired. It was a man's outfit and featured the following:

 A  hat; tall black hat worn at court
 A  a samurai's sword
 Red , worn primarily by men
 White  and red , a male Shinto outfit
 A  hand fan, which men carried

 also wore , white face makeup. This would cover their face and neck, and their eyebrows would be painted higher on the forehead.

Music
 songs were mostly based on Buddhist prayers. The songs were usually slow and rhythmic, with great meaning in the words. They also would sing  songs, which were poems using images of nature to convey meanings of circumstances in their lives. These songs typically had lines of seven and five syllables. Trademarks of their music included their voices, the drum and the flute.

Famous

Shizuka
Shizuka, commonly referred to as Shizuka Gozen, was the concubine and lover of Minamoto no Yoshitsune, the tragic hero of many folk legends. She was possibly born in 1168, and is popular in folk legends herself. She and Yoshitsune met and fell in love, but by the time she had become pregnant, Yoshitsune was on the run for his life. There she gave birth to a son, who was, according to some versions of the tales, promptly killed by his uncle Yoritomo, but survived in others. 

In some tales, Shizuka was then forced to perform a dance for Yoritomo and his wife Hōjō Masako at a temple celebration, where she sang a song of praise for her lover Yoshitsune. This greatly angered Yoritomo, and he intended on having her put to death but Masako begged for her life. Shizuka was freed and sought to follow Yoshitsune, but she learned of his death. She became a nun and died in 1189. Her song is famous and is still sung today by geisha.

Giō and Hotoke
Kiyomori cruelly sent Giō away, which grieved her greatly, and Hotoke was constantly ridden with guilt. A year later, Giō was asked to perform a dance for Hotoke at Kiyomori's command, who actually intended on humiliating her. In her grief and humiliation, Giō, her sister and their mother became nuns seeking for a happier life. A few years later, the guilt was too great for Hotoke and she too became a nun. She asked for forgiveness from Giō, who willingly forgave her and the four women lived out the rest of their days in prayer.

See also

References

External links

 A brief explanation of shirabyoshi
 Japan print gallery: shirabyoshi 
 Shirabyoshi on Immortal Geisha

Theatre in Japan
Dances of Japan
Cross-dressing
Sexuality in Shinto
Buddhism and sexuality
Women of medieval Japan